The Illinois and Michigan Canal connected the Great Lakes to the Mississippi River and the Gulf of Mexico. In Illinois, it ran  from the Chicago River in Bridgeport, Chicago to the Illinois River at LaSalle-Peru. The canal crossed the Chicago Portage, and helped establish Chicago as the transportation hub of the United States, before the railroad era. It was opened in 1848.  Its function was partially replaced by the wider and deeper Chicago Sanitary and Ship Canal in 1900, and it ceased transportation operations with the completion of the Illinois Waterway in 1933.

Illinois and Michigan Canal Locks and Towpath, a collection of eight engineering structures and segments of the canal between Lockport and LaSalle-Peru, was designated a National Historic Landmark in 1964.

Portions of the canal have been filled in.  Much of the former canal, near the Heritage Corridor transit line, has been preserved as part of the Illinois and Michigan Canal National Heritage Corridor.

Significance
In the 1800s Canals were an important mode of transportation. The Illinois and Michigan Canal connected the Mississippi Basin to the Great Lakes Basin. The potential canal route influenced Illinois's north border. The Erie Canal and the Illinois and Michigan Canal cemented cultural and trade ties to the Northeast rather than the South. Before the canal, agriculture in the region was limited to subsistence farming. The canal made agriculture in northern Illinois profitable by opening connections to eastern markets.

History

Conception
The first known Europeans to travel the area, Father Marquette and Louis Joliet went through the Chicago Portage on their return trip. Joliet remarked that with a canal they could remove the need to portage and the French could create an empire spanning the continent.

The first quantitative survey of the portage was performed in 1816 by Stephen H. Long.  It was on the basis of these measurements that he was able to make a specific proposal for a canal.

With several slave states recently admitted to the Union, Nathaniel Pope and Ninian Edwards saw the opportunity to make Illinois a state. They proposed moving the border northward from the southern tip of Lake Michigan to allow the canal to be within a single state. They believed that the canal would firmly align Illinois with the free states and so Congress granted them statehood even though Illinois did not meet the population requirements.

Construction

In 1824, Samuel D. Lockwood, one of the first commissioners of the canal, was given the authorization to hire contractors to survey a route for the canal to follow.

Construction on the canal began in 1836, although it was stopped for several years due to an Illinois state financial crisis related to the Panic of 1837. Still, money had to be borrowed from Eastern United States and British investors to finish the canal.

Most of the canal work was done by Irish immigrants who previously worked on the Erie Canal. The work was considered dangerous and many workers died, although no official records exist to indicate how many. The Irish immigrants who toiled to build the canal were often derided as a sub-class and were treated very poorly by other citizens of the city.

The canal was finished in 1848 at a total cost of $6,170,226. Chicago Mayor James Hutchinson Woodworth presided over the opening ceremony. Pumps were used to draw water to fill the canal near Chicago, which was soon supplemented by water from the Calumet Feeder Canal. The feeder was supplied by water from the Calumet River and originated in Blue Island, Il. The DuPage River provided water farther south. In 1871 the canal was deepened to speed up the current and to improve sewage disposal.

Completion
Towns were planned out along the path of the canal spaced at intervals corresponding to the length that the mules could haul the barges. It had seventeen locks and four aqueducts to cover the  height difference between Lake Michigan and the Illinois River. From 1848 to 1852 the canal was a popular passenger route, but passenger service ended in 1853 with the opening of the Chicago, Rock Island and Pacific Railroad that ran parallel to the canal. The canal had its peak shipping year in 1882 and remained in use until 1933.

Experiencing a remarkable recovery from the devastating Great Chicago Fire of 1871, Chicago rebuilt rapidly along the shores of the Chicago River. The river was especially important to the development of the city since all wastes from houses, farms, the stockyards, and other industries could be dumped into the river and carried out into Lake Michigan.

Decline and replacement

The lake, however, was also the source of drinking water. Although no epidemics occurred, the Chicago Sanitary District (now The Metropolitan Water Reclamation District) was created by the Illinois legislature in 1889 in response to this close call.

This new agency devised a plan to construct channels and canals to reverse the flow of the rivers away from Lake Michigan and divert the contaminated water downstream where it could be diluted as it flowed into the Des Plaines River and eventually the Mississippi.

In 1892, the direction of part of the Chicago River was reversed by the Army Corps of Engineers with the result that the river and much of Chicago's sewage flowed into the canal instead of into Lake Michigan. The complete reversal of the river's flow was accomplished when the Sanitary and Ship Canal was opened in 1900.

It was replaced in 1933 by the Illinois Waterway, which remains in use.

Rejuvenation
The actual origin site of the Illinois and Michigan Canal has been converted into a nature park that integrates history, ecology and art to communicate the Canal's importance in the development of Chicago. In 2003 the Chicago Park District - in cooperation with the I & M Canal Association, hired Conservation Design Forum to develop plans to convert the brownfield site into a landscape that provided for passive recreational uses in a landscape setting with native plant species. Interpretive panels built into a wall along a bike trail were designed by local high school art students. The plans also called on landscape stabilization techniques to repair a significantly degraded shoreline (water levels can fluctuate as much as 5 feet).

Today much of the canal is a long, thin linear park with canoeing and a  hiking and biking trail (constructed on the alignment of the mule tow paths). It also includes museums and historical canal buildings. It was designated the first National Heritage Corridor by US Congress in 1984.

Adjacent communities
Many towns in Northern Illinois owe their existence directly to the Illinois and Michigan Canal. Lockport, Morris, Ottawa, and LaSalle were platted by the Canal Commissioners to raise funds for the canal's construction. From east to west the towns along the path of the canal include:

 Bridgeport (Chicago neighborhood)
 Summit
 Willow Springs
 Lemont
 Romeoville
 Lockport
 Joliet
 Channahon
 Morris
 Seneca
 Marseilles
 Ottawa
 Utica
 LaSalle
 Peru

Associated individuals
 Louis Joliet 
 Gurdon Saltonstall Hubbard
 Nathaniel Pope
 Ninian Edwards
 Abraham Lincoln
 John T. Stuart

See also

 Channahon State Park
 Gebhard Woods State Park
 Matthew Laflin
 David Leavitt (banker)
 List of National Historic Landmarks in Illinois
 Shabbona Trail includes  of the Illinois and Michigan Canal Trail
 Treaty of St. Louis (1816)
 The Volunteer (canal boat)

References

Further reading
 
 Edward Ranney & Emily Harris, Prairie Passage: The Illinois and Michigan Canal Corridor. Urbana, IL: University of Illinois Press, 1998.

External links
Illinois & Michigan Canal National Heritage Corridor at U.S. National Park Service
Canal Corridor Association 
Canal and Regional History Special Collection at Lewis University
Illinois & Michigan Canal State Trail
Chicago Historical Society: Illinois & Michigan Canal

The Illinois and Michigan Canal, 1827–1911: A Selection of Documents from the Illinois State Archives
Metropolitan Water Reclamation District of Greater Chicago
Ottawa Visitors Center
Will County Historical Society, housed in original Canal Office

Canals in Illinois
Ship canals
Illinois River
Illinois waterways
Canals opened in 1848
Canals on the National Register of Historic Places in Illinois
Hiking trails in Illinois
History of Illinois
National Heritage Areas of the United States
National Historic Landmarks in Illinois
National Register of Historic Places in Grundy County, Illinois
National Register of Historic Places in LaSalle County, Illinois
National Register of Historic Places in Will County, Illinois
Transportation in Chicago
History of Joliet, Illinois
Lockport, Illinois
Historic American Engineering Record in Illinois
1848 establishments in Illinois
Chicago Landmarks